Raquel Dancho  (born April 16, 1990) is a Canadian politician who serves as the member of Parliament (MP) for Kildonan—St. Paul, Manitoba. A member of the Conservative Party, Dancho was elected following the 2019 Canadian federal election.

Early life 
Dancho was raised in the small farming community of Beauséjour, Manitoba. She attended McGill University first as a business student before switching to political science. Upon finishing her education, Dancho returned to Manitoba where she unsuccessfully sought a seat in the Legislative Assembly of Manitoba, after which she worked for several ministers in Brian Pallister's government.

Political career 
Dancho unsuccessfully contested the district of Wolseley for the Progressive Conservatives in the 2016 provincial election.

In 43rd Canadian Parliament
Following the defeat of the Conservatives in the 2019 Canadian federal election in which she prevailed in the riding of Kildonan-St. Paul, she was appointed to the Official Opposition's Shadow Cabinet by Andrew Scheer, serving as Shadow Minister for Diversity, Inclusion and Youth.

Dancho supported Erin O'Toole in the 2020 Conservative Party of Canada leadership election.

In November 2021 she was appointed by O'Toole the Shadow Minister for Public Safety and vice-chair of the Standing Committee on Public Safety and National Security (SECU).

In 44th Canadian Parliament
On 25 February 2022 interim Conservative leader Candice Bergen re-appointed Dancho the Shadow Minister for Public Safety.

During the Freedom Convoy 2022 protests, Raquel opposed the Prime Minister's measures, which she sees as draconian and against fundamental freedoms. She also supports an end to mandates. She urged the government to provide solutions and leadership to millions of Canadians affected by these measures.

Electoral record

Federal

Provincial

References

External links

1990 births
Living people
Conservative Party of Canada MPs
Members of the House of Commons of Canada from Manitoba
Politicians from Winnipeg
Women members of the House of Commons of Canada
21st-century Canadian politicians
21st-century Canadian women politicians